Mystery of the Wolf is a 2006 Finnish drama directed by Raimo O Niemi.

Synopsis
Mystery of the Wolf tells the story of Salla, a girl who has been abandoned by her mother and falls under the protection of a pack of wolves.  After being found and returned to society, Salla still feels a strong connection to wild animals, and as she grows has to decide between her loyalties to her family and to the animals that once protected her.

Awards

First Light Young Jurors Award, London Children's Film Festival.
Golden Cairo for Best Film, Cairo International Film Festival.
49. Nordische Filmtage Lübeck, Germany Prize of the Children's Jury
Moscow Film Festival for Children and Young People, Russia Moscow Teddy Bear.
7th Riga International Children's Film Festival “Berimor's Cinema”, Latvia, Audience Award.

References
http://www.cinema.com.my/movies/movie_contents.aspx?search=2007.4435.mysterywolf.8977&section=review

External links 
 

2006 films
Finnish adventure films
Finnish drama films
Films about wolves
2000s Finnish-language films